Chandipur is a village, in Chandipur CD block in Tamluk subdivision of Purba Medinipur district in the state of West Bengal, India.

Geography

Police station
Chandipur police station has jurisdiction over Chandipur CD block. Chandipur police station covers an area of 138.86 km2 with a population of 188,065.

CD block HQ
The headquarters of Chandipur CD block are located at Chandipur.

Urbanisation
94.08% of the population of Tamluk subdivision live in the rural areas. Only 5.92% of the population live in the urban areas, and that is the second lowest proportion of urban population amongst the four subdivisions in Purba Medinipur district, just above Egra subdivision.

Note: The map alongside presents some of the notable locations in the subdivision. All places marked in the map are linked in the larger full screen map.

Demographics
As per 2011 Census of India Chandipur had a total population of 2,343 of which 1,186 (51%) were males and 1,157 (49%) were females. Population below 6 years was 217. The total number of literates in Chandipur was 2,025 (95.25% of the population over 6 years).

Transport
SH 4 connecting Jhalda (in Purulia district) and Digha (in Purba Medinipur district) passes through Chandipur.

There is a road linking Chandipur and Nandigram.

Lavan Satyagraha Smarak railway station is situated on the Tamluk-Digha line,

Healthcare
Erashal Rural Hospital at Erashal, PO Math Chandipur (with 30 beds) is the main medical facility in Chandipur CD block. There are primary health centres at Gokhuri, PO Majnaberia (with 2 beds) and Baraghuni (with 10 beds).

References

Villages in Purba Medinipur district